Radio 74 Internationale is a network of Christian radio stations in the United States, broadcasting Christian talk and teaching programs as well as Christian music.

History
Radio 74's origins lie in a radio station in France, established in 1982. The first American affiliate was WHHC-LP in New Castle, Indiana, which began broadcasting in 2004, with many other affiliates also signing on that year. Its flagship station is KRSF in Ridgecrest, California.

Stations
Radio 74 Internationale is heard on 56 stations, as well as five low-powered translators, along with a mix of digital audio-only subchannels (usually #.74) and SAP audio broadcasts over the television stations of 3ABN. Many of Radio 74's affiliates are owned by local Seventh-day Adventist (SDA) churches (3ABN supports the mission of the SDA).

Translators

References

External links
Radio 74 Internationale's official website

Christian radio stations in the United States
American radio networks
Seventh-day Adventist media
Independent ministries of the Seventh-day Adventist Church